Mount Prince Henry is a remote  mountain summit located in Height of the Rockies Provincial Park, in the Canadian Rockies of British Columbia, Canada. The mountain is part of The Royal Group, a subset of the Rockies, which includes Mount King George, Mount Queen Mary, Mount Princess Mary, Mount Prince George, Mount Prince Albert, Mount Prince John, and Mount Prince Edward. Its nearest higher peak is Mount Prince Edward,  to the south-southeast. Mt. Prince Henry is composed of sedimentary rock laid down during the Cambrian period. Formed in shallow seas, this sedimentary rock was pushed east and over the top of younger rock during the Laramide orogeny.

History

The mountain was named in 1913 by the Interprovincial Boundary Survey for Prince Henry, Duke of Gloucester (1900-1974), the third son of King George V. The name was officially adopted in the 16th Report of the Geographic Board of Canada in 1919.

The first ascent of Mount Prince Henry was made in 1929 by Kate (Katie) Gardiner with Walter Feuz as guide.

Climate

Based on the Köppen climate classification, Mount Prince Henry is located in a subarctic climate zone with cold, snowy winters, and mild summers.

See also

 Geography of British Columbia
 Geology of British Columbia

References

External links
 Mount Prince Henry weather forecast
 BC Parks: Height of the Rockies Provincial Park

Three-thousanders of British Columbia
Canadian Rockies
Kootenay Land District